"Maggie's Dream" is a song written by Dave Loggins and Lisa Silver, and recorded by American country music artist Don Williams.  It was released in September 1984 as the second single from the album Cafe Carolina.  The song reached number 11 on the Billboard Hot Country Singles & Tracks chart. It was covered by Trisha Yearwood on the 2017 Williams tribute album Gentle Giants: The Music of Don Williams.

Chart performance

References

1984 singles
Don Williams songs
Trisha Yearwood songs
Songs written by Dave Loggins
Song recordings produced by Garth Fundis
MCA Records singles
1984 songs
Songs written by Lisa Silver